The Arch of Marcus Aurelius is a Roman triumphal arch in the city of Oea, modern Tripoli, Libya, where it is found near the northeastern entrance to the Medina.

Characteristics

It is a quadrifrons triumphal arch, surmounted by an unusual octagonal cupola, and was erected (entirely in marble) by Gaius Calpurnius Celsus, quinquennial duumvir of the city, to commemorate the victories of Lucius Verus, junior colleague and adoptive brother of the Emperor Marcus Aurelius, over the Parthians in the Roman–Parthian War of 161–66.

The monument was actually erected in 165, and cannot be dated later, because the Emperor is referred to with the title Armenicus, but not with the titles of Medicus and Parthicus, which were conferred on him in 166.

The patron deities of the city, Apollo and Minerva appear on the two front pediments, in bigae drawn by griffons and sphinxes. Other interpretations take the figures in the bigae as representing Lucius Verus and the goddess Roma, respectively.

The four niches placed on the northeast and southwest faces of the arch are now empty, but they must have contained the statues of the Emperor and Lucius Verus, which were recovered during excavations in the nineteenth century.

The arch has been partially buried in the course of the centuries.

Immediately after the Italian conquest, it received conservation and restoration work from the Italian administration (1914–1918), while the zone around the arch was reorganized by the Italian architect Florestano Di Fausto in the thirties of last century. It was partially hit during WW2, but only with minor damages.

As of 2017, the Arch is suffering from poor maintenance and damage from visitors. Its original features and details have suffered considerable damage due to acid rain.

See also
List of Roman triumphal arches
Roman Libya

Notes

Further reading
 Meyers, Rachel. 2017. "A New Examination of the Arch of Marcus Aurelius and Lucius Verus at Oea". Journal of Ancient History, 5(1), pp. 93-1993. 

Ancient Roman triumphal arches
Buildings and structures in Tripoli, Libya
Lucius Verus
165
Buildings and structures completed in the 2nd century
World Heritage Sites in Libya
Ruins in Libya